Ahmad Sara or Ahmadsara may refer to:
 Ahmad Sara, Gilan
 Ahmad Sara, Shaft, Gilan Province
 Ahmad Sara, Mazandaran